Foggbrook is an area of Offerton in Stockport, England.

References

Areas of Stockport